Marine Barracks is a historic barracks located at the Philadelphia Naval Shipyard, Philadelphia, Pennsylvania. It was built in 1901, and is a four-story, red brick and gypsum block building. It features a central rounded archway, open porch, and tile roof.  It was built by and remains occupied by the United States Marine Corps.

Some of the first Naval Aviators landed and took off from the parade grounds in the front of the building. The Marine Barracks was added to the National Register of Historic Places in 1976.

References

Barracks on the National Register of Historic Places
Military facilities on the National Register of Historic Places in Philadelphia
Government buildings completed in 1901
Residential buildings completed in 1901
South Philadelphia
1901 establishments in Pennsylvania